General elections were held in Romania on 3 November 1996, with a second round of the presidential election on 17 November.

Opinion polls prior to the elections suggested incumbent President Ion Iliescu of the Social Democracy Party of Romania (PDSR, formerly the Democratic National Salvation Front) would win a third term, though it was believed a large field of candidates would push him into a runoff. Iliescu received the most votes in the first round, just ahead of his 1992 runoff opponent, Emil Constantinescu of the Romanian Democratic Convention (CDR). 

In the second round, Constantinescu defeated Iliescu with 54 percent of the vote. Iliescu conceded defeat soon after the polls closed. Constantinescu took office on 29 November, marking the first peaceful transfer of power since the fall of Communism. To date, it is the only time since the introduction of direct presidential elections that an incumbent president has been defeated when running for re-election.

The CDR, a broad coalition of parties opposing the governing centre-left PDSR, also emerged as the largest bloc in Parliament, winning 122 of the 343 seats in the Chamber of Deputies and 53 of the 143 seats in the Senate.

Presidential candidates

Results

President

Petre Roman, György Frunda, Gheorghe Funar and Nicolae Manolescu openly endorsed Constantinescu in the second round. Corneliu Vadim Tudor, Tudor Mohora and Adrian Păunescu openly endorsed Iliescu.

Parliament

Senate

Romanian Democratic Convention (CDR) members included the PNȚ-CD, PNL, PNL-CD (1 senator), PAR (3 senators), PER (1 senator), Ecologist Federation of Romania (FER) (1 senator).

Chamber of Deputies

References

Parliamentary elections in Romania
Presidential elections in Romania
Romania
General
Presidential election
Romania